WR 12 (V378 Velorum) is a spectroscopic binary in the constellation Vela. It is an eclipsing binary consisting of a Wolf-Rayet star and a luminous companion of unknown spectral type. The primary is one of the most luminous stars known.

The spectrum of WR 12 is dominated by the broad emission lines of the primary Wolf-Rayet star. The lowest ionisation nitrogen emission lines are strongest, with NV lines being very weak. The HeI lines are stronger than the HeII lines. Unusually the hydrogen emission is stronger still, leading to a WN8h spectral class. CIV emission is almost undetectable. It has been suggested that the companion is a class O star, but its lines cannot be seen in the spectrum.

The system produces eclipses which dim the brightness of the star by 0.12 magnitudes every 24 days. The stars are detached and so it is classified as an Algol-type eclipsing binary. The inclination of the orbit has been estimated at 78.8° but a full orbital solution is not available because the secondary cannot be directly detected.

References

Vela (constellation)
Wolf–Rayet stars
Spectroscopic binaries
J08444729-4558554
Durchmusterung objects
Velorum, V378
Algol variables